French Society may refer to:

 the French people
 Société Honoraire de Français, The Society
 Pi Delta Phi,  Honor Society
 The Western Society for French History
 The Society for French Historical Studies
 The French Society for Urban Studies

See also 

France (disambiguation)
French (disambiguation)